IFK Malmö is a Swedish sports club.

IFK Malmö may also refer to:

IFK Malmö Bandy
IFK Malmö Fotboll
IFK Malmö Handboll

Sports teams in Sweden
Multi-sport clubs in Sweden